Jorge Díaz Cruz (September 15, 1914 – 1998) served as Associate Justice of the Puerto Rico Supreme Court.

Cruz was born in Ponce, Puerto Rico to a family of well-known public figures.  His great-grandfather was Román Baldorioty de Castro, the founder of Puerto Rico's autonomist movement, His grandfather was journalist and author Arístides Díaz y Díaz, and his father served as Superintendent of Public Education.

A 1930 graduate of Central High School in Santurce, Puerto Rico, he obtained his bachelor's degree as well as his law degree at the University of Puerto Rico School of Law.  He practiced law in Yauco, Puerto Rico for 35 years, refusing the entreaties of Puerto Rico Senate Majority Leader Luis Negrón López and Governor Luis Muñoz Marín to accept appointments to public office.  Finally, in 1973, he allowed his friend, Governor Rafael Hernández Colón to place his name in nomination for Associate Justice, a nomination strongly supported by the Governor's father, former Associate Justice Rafael Hernández Matos and by Negrón López.  He served on the Court for 11 years, until his retirement on May 16, 1984.

Díaz Cruz died in 1998, at the age of 83.

Sources 

La Justicia en sus Manos by Luis Rafael Rivera, 

Associate Justices of the Supreme Court of Puerto Rico
Puerto Rican lawyers
1914 births
1998 deaths
20th-century Puerto Rican lawyers
20th-century American judges